Rochambeau The French International School of Washington DC is a private French international school in Montgomery County, Maryland, near Washington, D.C. It maintains its administrative headquarters and its secondary campus in Bethesda, a preschool campus in Bethesda, and an elementary school in Chevy Chase. Circa 2022 preschool and elementary grades will relocate to a new campus in Bethesda.

History
Rochambeau The French International School was founded in 1955, and has a current total enrollment of approximately 1100 students, the largest of the nine French schools in the United States. Rochambeau The French International School, formerly known as Lycée Rochambeau, is a non-denominational, coeducational, day school serving students from nursery (age 2, toute petite section) through high school and the last year of the French secondary system (Terminale) on three campuses located just outside the city of Washington, D.C. Rochambeau offers a French Immersion program for non-French speakers from nursery school until 3rd grade.

In 1992 the school had plans for a new campus for all grades K-12 and the administration in an area in Potomac, Maryland, and that year it acquired land there. Area residents complained as they feared there would be more vehicular traffic. Liz Spayd of the Washington Post wrote "The community's opposition has been interpreted by some to be a thinly veiled attempt to keep foreigners out of Potomac". In November 1993 the county planning board gave disapproval to the French school's plans there.

Campuses
The School's secondary school accommodates approximately 309 students on an  campus in Bethesda, the Forest Road Campus; the same campus houses the school's administrative offices. The preschool (maternelle) classes are at the Bradley Campus in Bethesda. The elementary school classes are at the Rollingwood Campus in Chevy Chase. Circa 2022 the school plans to open a new preschool and elementary campus in Bethesda.

Previously it had a campus in Chevy Chase, Maryland.

Student body
Approximately forty-nine percent (48.996%) of students hold French citizenship (with a large percentage of those holding a second citizenship), fourteen percent (14%) are U.S. citizens, and thirty-seven percent (37%) come from fifty-five (55) other nations. Many Rochambeau students come from families who are in Washington, D.C. on postings with embassies, foreign-owned corporations, and multilateral organizations.

In 1993 most students came from countries that spoke French, including France, Belgium, and multiple countries in Africa.

Graduation requirements
To receive the high school diploma accredited by the State of Maryland, Lycée Rochambeau students must complete a minimum of 21 Carnegie units. Twenty of these units must be in specified areas:
 4 units in English
 4 units in French
 4 units in Social studies to include 1 credit in U.S. History
 3 units in Science
 3 units in Mathematics
 2 units in a third foreign language

The French Baccalauréat degree is awarded only when a student has completed a fifth year of study and has passed the Baccalauréat examinations.

Because the Maryland-accredited high school diploma is usually awarded to students before their last year of study at the Lycée, students who have earned the diploma and who plan to attend U.S. colleges and universities have the option of leaving the Lycée without completing the Terminale year and without sitting for the Baccalauréat examinations. More than ninety-five percent (95%) of students at the Lycée, however, choose to stay for the Terminale year in order to sit for the Baccalauréat examinations.

Structure and curriculum
All French lycées follow the academic curriculum established by the French National Ministry of Education.  Rochambeau's faculty members are certified by the same French ministry. The student-faculty ratio is 10 to 1, with all courses being taught in French. However, English and U.S civilization classes are taught in English, along with History classes in the International Baccalauréat section (see OIB section of this article). Beginning in the first year of Middle School (6ème), Spanish, German and Arabic are offered as a second language, with each student having to choose one of those languages. English language instruction is offered at four levels with placement depending on a student’s level of proficiency: Group 1 – ESL; Group 2 – standard English; Group 3 – Honors English; and Group 4—OIB English. During the Terminale year, Groups 1 and 2 and Groups 3 and 4 are combined, and a separate Group is created for the OIB section. In addition, students may enroll in a Latin class, which is made available to them at the beginning of Middle School and continues on until the final year of High School. Theater, Cinema, Art and Music  may be chosen separately as optional classes during the first year of High School.

Course load
During the final three years of secondary education, Lycée students often carry a course load of 37 to 40 hours per week, with a corresponding amount of homework. School hours are 8:30 a.m. to 3:20 p.m. or 5:30 p.m for upperclassmen, depending on each academic student's schedule. Given the long school day and heavy academic load, students have little time to pursue extracurricular activities. However, various activities are organized by different student groups, including a talent show, which takes place before December break and features students presenting particular talents. Sports, such as swimming, rugby, basketball, volleyball or soccer, are accessible to students of different grades. The lycée also celebrates the Fête de la francophonie, emphasizing the diverse francophone cultures from which the various students come.

In 2021 there are clubs for every grade. There is a programming club for the 3emes and lower. There is also a SIA (Section Internationale Americaine) for students 6emes or lower.

French Baccalauréat
During the last two years of French secondary education (Première and Terminale), students choose concentrations in one of the following specialized academic tracks (Séries du Baccalauréat):
 Série L (Languages, Literature and Humanities)
 Série ES (Economics and Social Sciences)
 Série S (Mathematics and Sciences)
In addition to their concentration courses, all Lycée Rochambeau students are required to enroll in English, a second modern foreign language in addition to English (Spanish, German, Italian, Arabic, etc.), history and geography, and philosophy.

Baccalauréat examinations are developed at the French national level, with the same examinations being given at lycées worldwide at the end of the Première and Terminale years. Each section of the Baccalauréat examinations consists of a series of essays requiring in-depth analysis and a well-reasoned response. The written section of the Baccalauréat is scheduled over a two-week period, encompassing 17–32 hours of testing. Students also present two to four oral examinations.
Over the past ten years, the success rate on the Baccalauréat examination at the Lycée Rochambeau has averaged approximately 96.2%, with over 66% of the students receiving honors, compared with the annual pass rate at 90.95% at other French lycées in the U.S.

However, there has recently been a change to the structure of the French Baccalauréat exam which has dissolved these specialized academic tracks. The Lycée Rochambeau is fully incorporating these changes into their curriculum as of the 2019-2020 academic year.

International Option of the French Baccalauréat (OIB)
Within the context of the Baccalauréat's international options (the option internationale du baccalauréat, or OIB) the Lycée offers the American Option. The Lycée’s OIB American Option, which is taught by French and American faculty, is an optional three-year program that offers students advanced level studies in English language and literature and an integrated curriculum in world history and geography.  The OIB is not a separate diploma, but rather an additional specialization within the framework of any of the three Séries of the Baccalauréat. The concept, curriculum, and evaluation standards of the OIB American Option have been developed by the French Ministry of Education and the Advanced Placement Division of the College Board.  To meet the requirements of the Lycée’s OIB specialization, students must pass rigorous written and oral examinations given in English and evaluated by external examiners provided by the Advanced Placement Division of the College Board.

Alumni
 Florent Groberg 
 Juan Urdangarín y de Borbón
 Francine Lacqua

See also
 American School of Paris – An American international school in France
 Collèges - Initial Secondary school education system in France
 Lycées - Secondary school education system in France

References

External links

 School review by parents

Rochambeau
French-American culture in Maryland
Private K-12 schools in Montgomery County, Maryland
Schools in Bethesda, Maryland
French international schools in the United States
Educational institutions established in 1955
1955 establishments in Maryland